Jacynthe Carrier (born 1982) is a Canadian artist.

Education
Carrier holds a BFA degree in visual and media arts from the Université du Québec à Montréal and a Master of Fine Arts degree in photography from Concordia University.

Solo exhibitions 
Défoncer les murs, Le Diamant, Québec, 2019
Paysage : faire le jour, Musée d'art de Joliette, 2018
 La lignée, Sobey Art Award, Art Museum, Toronto, 2017
 Cycle, Centre Clark, Montreal, 2016
Les Eux, La Bande Vidéo, Quebec, 2014
Parcours, Centre occurrence, Montreal, 2012

Awards and collections
Carrier was a finalist for the 2017 Sobey Prize. Her work is included in the collections of the Musée national des beaux-arts du Québec and the Musée des beaux-arts de Montréal.

References

Living people
1982 births
21st-century Canadian women artists